Little Barrier Island, or Hauturu in Māori (the official Māori title is Te Hauturu-o-Toi), lies off the northeastern coast of New Zealand's North Island. Located  to the north of Auckland, the island is separated from the mainland to the west by Jellicoe Channel, and from the larger Great Barrier Island to the east by Cradock Channel. The two aptly named islands shelter the Hauraki Gulf from many of the storms of the Pacific Ocean.

Settled by the Māori between 1350 and 1650, the island was occupied by them until the New Zealand government declared the island a wildlife sanctuary in 1897. Since the island came under control of the government, it has been under limited access, with only a few rangers living on the island. In the Māori language, the name of the island name means "the resting place of lingering breezes". Along with its larger neighbour Great Barrier, it was given its English name by Captain James Cook in 1769.

The island is a nature sanctuary which has been described by the MBIE as "the most intact [native] ecosystem in New Zealand". However, several invasive species were introduced by both Maori and European settlers, including cats, which were destructive to local small bird and reptile species until they were eradicated between July 1977 and June 1980 in what was possibly New Zealand's costliest pest control programme.

History 

Māori occupied the island for centuries prior to the first European visits, probably first settling there between 1350 and 1650 CE. The initial occupation was by descendants of Toi te Huatahi, followed by Tainui, who were then conquered by Ngāti Wai. By 1881 only a few Ngāti Wai were still living there and the British Crown attempted to buy the island in order to turn it into a nature reserve. After the purchase fell through, the island was instead appropriated through an Act of Parliament in 1894 and became New Zealand's first nature reserve the following year. Maori such as Rahui Te Kiri were evicted from the island by force in 1896. Since 1897, there has always been a caretaker or ranger resident on the island. In 2011 the crown settled treaty claims with local iwi, Hauturu was returned to iwi who in turn gifted it back to the people of Aotearoa.

Access is heavily restricted for conservation reasons, and the island is uninhabited except for rotational conservation staff, scientists and rangers under the authority of the Department of Conservation. Electricity for their needs was provided by a diesel generator linked to a battery bank until 2005, and has since been replaced by twenty 175-watt solar panels, with the generator remaining solely for backup. Over the expected 20-year life-span, the new system is expected to generate fuel savings sufficient to replace its purchase costs.

Stonework

Māori stonework has been found in fourteen locations on the island, primarily around the coastal flats at Te Titoki Point. Man-made cuttings, which were described in 1895 as ruts for hauling canoes, can be seen on the boulder beach ridge at Te Titoki Point.

The most extensive stonework is located in the northwest of the island, near the ridge south of Te Hue Stream, where it is spread over several hectares. This site includes a number of terraces, which are stone-faced or have stone retaining walls. There are also numerous stone heaps and rows, and several free standing stone walls.

Stonework in the northeast of the island is more weathered than in other areas and partially buried. Because of this weathering these features are thought to be older than at the other sites.

Geography 

Its earliest volcanic activity is estimated to have occurred 3 million years ago and the latest 1.2 million years ago. The volcanic activity on the island is associated with the Coromandel Volcanic Zone, which later moved southwards to form the modern Taupō Volcanic Zone. The island was one of the final volcanic events in the zone, as most volcanism in the zone occurred between 18 and 4 million years ago.

Te Titoki Point is the only area of flat land on the island.

Approximately 18,000 years ago during the Last Glacial Maximum when sea levels were over 100 metres lower than present day levels, Little Barrier Island was landlocked to the North Island, surrounded by a vast coastal plain where the Hauraki Gulf / Tīkapa Moana exists today. Sea levels began to rise 7,000 years ago, after which Little Barrier became an island separated from the rest of New Zealand. During the glacial period, a river formed by the Mahurangi River and Waitematā Harbour river flowed between Little Barrier Island and Great Barrier Island.

Environment

A dense forest cover shelters numerous rare or endangered animal species. The total number of species of native plants is thought to range around 400, and the island may shelter more endangered birds than any other island in New Zealand. The island has been identified as an Important Bird Area by BirdLife International because it is a nesting site for vulnerable Cook's and Parkinson's petrels. In February 2013, there were reports of the critically endangered New Zealand storm petrel (Oceanites maorianus) breeding on the island. 

When Māori occupied the island, as much as a third of the island was cleared of forest. However, since the acquisition of the land by the New Zealand government, all but 20 hectares of the island have been reforested.

Bryde's whales, orcas and bottlenose dolphins live in the waters around the island. Blue whales and southern right whales rest in this area during migration. In 2012, there were reports that a southern right whale may have calved near the island.

Kākāpō 
Kākāpō (night parrots), also critically endangered, were first translocated to Little Barrier Island/Hauturu in 1982. Kākāpō successfully bred on the island in the 1980's and 1990's with the support of supplementary food. All birds were later removed in 1999, so that kiore (Polynesian rats) could be eradicated from the island using poison bait.

Kākāpō were then (re)introduced to the island in 2012; as of July 2017, their population on the island stood at 14.

Hauturu is a testing site to see if the kākāpō can breed and raise their young successfully without human intervention.  As Hauturu is a large predator free island, there is great potential for the kākāpō in the long term.

Invasive Species

Mammals
The Polynesian rat or kiore (Rattus exulans) were likely introduced as invasive species during the initial settlement of the island by Māori. Rat eradication took place by aerial-dropped poison baits in 2004.

Feral cats arrived on the island in the early 1870s. As in other places where predatory species were introduced, small animals not accustomed to predation likely experienced a decline in population, being pushed towards endangerment or extinction. In a survey of studies about eradicating the cats, scientist C.R. ("Dick") Veitch mentions several small species which were likely affected by the cats, including small reptiles and birds, such as the North Island snipe (Coenocorypha barrierensis), which only survived into the European era on this island and was formerly distributed across the entirety of the North Island, North Island saddleback (Philesturnus rufusater), grey-faced petrel (Pterodroma macroptera gouldi), Cook's petrel (Pterodroma cookii) and black petrel (Proeellaria parkinsoni). Cat eradication was completed by a dedicated team from July 1977 to 23 June 1980, and 151 cats were killed using traps and poison.

Insects

Introduced wasps (German, Common, Asian Paper, and Tasmanian paper wasps) are all present on the island.

Plants

Prior to 1995, very little attention was paid to weed species on the island. The rangers' garden had been planted in exotics, and bird and wind dispersed colonising species that spread rapidly. In 1996 a weed control programme, based on the successful work on the Kermadecs, was implemented with teams of weeders grid-searching the island. The main target species were climbing asparagus, the Mexican devil, and the mist flower.

See also

 List of volcanoes in New Zealand
 List of islands of New Zealand
 Lists of islands
 Desert island

References

External links

Kermode, Leslie Owen (1966). Little Barrier Island, An Encyclopaedia of New Zealand.
Department of Conservation – Little Barrier Island (Hauturu) Nature Reserve
Cultural Heritage of the Gulf (brief history on page 5)

Islands of the Hauraki Gulf
Important Bird Areas of New Zealand
Inactive volcanoes
Island restoration
Islands of the Auckland Region
Nature reserves in New Zealand
Pleistocene stratovolcanoes
Pliocene stratovolcanoes
Protected areas of the Auckland Region
Uninhabited islands of New Zealand
Volcanic islands of New Zealand
Stratovolcanoes of New Zealand
Volcanoes of the Auckland Region